Dance, Little Lady is a 1954 British drama film directed by Val Guest and starring Terence Morgan, Mai Zetterling, Guy Rolfe and Mandy Miller. The film was made by independent producer George Minter and distributed by his Renown Pictures. It was shot in Eastmancolor at the Walton Studios near London. The film's sets were designed by the art director Frederick Pusey.

Plot
Prima ballerina Nina Gordon is being financially exploited by her husband Mark (Terence Morgan). On the night of her triumphant Royal Opera House debut, she discovers he is also being unfaithful. Distraught, she leaves the party they were attending. However, Mark pulls up in their car and she gets in and he drives off at speed into the night. There is a car crash and Nina's leg is badly broken.

Learning that she'll never dance again, Nina is abandoned by Mark. But with the help of a sympathetic doctor (Guy Rolfe), Nina recovers the use of her legs, and begins to live her life vicariously through her talented daughter (Mandy Miller). When Mark reenters Nina's life, intending to take control of the daughter's dancing career, he finds the tables are turned on him.

Cast

 Terence Morgan as Mark Gordon  
 Mai Zetterling as Nina Gordon  
 Guy Rolfe as Dr. John Ransome  
 Mandy Miller as Jill Gordon  
 Eunice Gayson as Adele  
 Reginald Beckwith as Poldi  
 Ina De La Haye as Mme. Bayanova  
 Harold Lang as Mr. Bridson  
 Lisa Gastoni as 	Amaryllis
 Jane Aird as Mary  
 David Poole as Dancer  
 Maryon Lane as Dancer 
 Richard O'Sullivan as Peter 
 William Kendall as Mr. Matthews  
 Joan Hickson as Mrs. Matthews  
 Alexander Gauge as Joseph Miller  
 Vera Day as Gladys
 Gabrielle Blunt as Switchboard Operator
 Marianne Stone as Nurse
 Helen Goss as 	Neighbour
 Joan Benham as Nurse
 Molly Lumley as 	Dresser 
 Jane Asher as Child
 Ronald Dorey as Fire Engine Driver

Critical reception
The Radio Times wrote, "the dance sequences are fine, but the poor production values ruin the look of the film" ; while TV Guide called it "a trite film" ; but Sky Movies wrote, "Terence Morgan makes the best impression, as a sponger as smooth as he is nasty, in this ballet-orientated story, tailored to the talents of Britain's then screen wonder child, Mandy Miller. It bases its appeal on a blend of small-girl sentiment, highly coloured melodramatics and ballet (the dance ensembles are very well done). Mai Zetterling and Guy Rolfe provide rather limp support to Mandy's undeniable charm, but the story's fiery climax is most effective."

Box Office
According to Kinematograph Weekly the film was a "money maker" at the British box office in 1954.

References

External links
 

1954 films
1954 drama films
British drama films
1950s English-language films
Films directed by Val Guest
Films shot at Nettlefold Studios
Films set in London

1950s British films